The 1977–78 season was Newport County's 16th consecutive season in the Football League Fourth Division and their 50th season overall in the Football League. Despite the eventual lowly 16th-place finish, this season was a much-improved performance over the previous season's relegation battle. The club was actually in third place with promotion looking likely with ten games to go, but those games yielded a mere three points and County missed out again on a return to the Third Division.

Season review

Results summary

Results by round

Fixtures and results

Fourth Division

FA Cup

Football League Cup

Welsh Cup

League table

P = Matches played; W = Matches won; D = Matches drawn; L = Matches lost; F = Goals for; A = Goals against; GD = Goal difference; Pts = Points

External links
 Newport County 1977-1978 : Results
 Newport County football club match record: 1978
 Welsh Cup 1977/78

1977-78
English football clubs 1977–78 season
1977–78 in Welsh football